Runaway is a 2009 animated short by Canadian animator Cordell Barker. The film received a special jury award for short films at the Annecy International Animation Film Festival and was named the best animated short film at the 2010 Genie Awards.  In 2010 the film won the Yorkton Film Festival Golden Sheaf Award for Best Animation.

The film was also selected for the Sundance Film Festival and was short-listed, though not nominated, for the Academy Award for Best Animated Short Film. It was also included in the Animation Show of Shows.

Plot 

The film's story takes place aboard an out-of-control train. Barker intended the film to be a parable about life, and how the ruling class tries in vain to insulate itself from the fate suffered by the lower classes:

Production 

The film was produced in Winnipeg by Michael Scott and Derek Mazur for the National Film Board of Canada.  The musical score for the film was composed by Benoît Charest, known for composing the film score for the animated film The Triplets of Belleville (Les Triplettes de Belleville).

Runaway took Barker eight years to complete. The entire film was made with hand-drawn animation, with the exception of some more visually complex scenes:

Cast 
Richard Condie as the Captain
Leonard Waldner as the Fireman
Muriel Hogue as the Lady

Musicians 

Chet Doxas, clarinet
Jim Doxas, drum kit
Mike Cartile, trumpet
Al McClean, saxophone
Dave Martin, tuba
Morgan Moore, bass
John Sadowy, piano

References

External links
Watch Runaway at NFB.ca

Films directed by Cordell Barker
National Film Board of Canada animated short films
2009 short films
Films set on trains
Best Animated Short Film Genie and Canadian Screen Award winners
2009 animated films
2009 films
2000s animated short films
Animated films about trains
Canadian animated short films
Quebec films
2000s English-language films
2000s Canadian films